The Apocalypse Stone is an adventure module for the 2nd edition of the Advanced Dungeons & Dragons fantasy role-playing game. It was published in 2000.

Plot summary
The Apocalypse Stone is an adventure designed for 4-6 characters of level 15 and above. It is intended to be the final adventure of a long-running campaign, which is likely to bring about the end of a campaign world.

Publication history
The Apocalypse Stone was published by Wizards of the Coast, and was written by Jason Carl and Chris Pramas.

Reception
The Apocalypse Stone was reviewed in Volume 2 of Pyramid on January 21, 2000. The reviewer noted that the adventure is designed for powerful characters and noted that it "would work best as part of a seriously long-running (years at least) campaign". The reviewer remained intentionally vague about "the details of the bigger picture of this adventure as the potential enjoyment of this adventure depends heavily upon the DM keeping his/her players in the dark as to what's really going on. If you run this one correctly your players won't be disappointed. They may very well end up seriously ticked off, but not disappointed."

References

Dungeons & Dragons modules
Role-playing game supplements introduced in 2000